Ajiona Alexus Brown (born March 16, 1996) is an American actress known for her roles in The Rickey Smiley Show,  Empire, 13 Reasons Why, Acrimony, and Breaking In. She started her career in 2008, at the age of 12.

Early life 
Alexus was born on March 16, 1996, in Tuskegee, Alabama. She studied Theater Arts at the Alabama School of Fine Arts.

Career
In 2021, she appeared in the Starz crime drama television series BMF, opposite Russell Hornsby, Da'Vinchi, Demetrius Flenory Jr. (who portrayed Demetrius Flenory), Eric Kofi-Abrefa, and Michole Briana White.

Filmography

Film

Television

Discography

Mixtapes

Singles

Promotional singles

Music videos

References

External links
 

1996 births
Living people
Actresses from Alabama
American television actresses
American film actresses
21st-century American actresses
African-American actresses
21st-century African-American women
21st-century African-American people
People from Tuskegee, Alabama